Langlois  is an unincorporated community and census-designated place in Curry County, Oregon, United States, on the Oregon Coast established in 1881.  It had a population of 177 in 2010. Langlois was once famous for its blue cheese, until the cheese factory burned down in the 1950s. It was never rebuilt.

Langlois was named for William Langlois, an early Oregon pioneer. As phonetically spelled in the 1860 Federal Census, Port Oxford Precint, page 110, the name was pronounced "Langless,” however the modern pronunciation used by the local residents today is “Lang-loyce.” (It rhymes with Joyce.)

The population consists primarily of retirees, with a healthy mix of ranchers and farmers. The logging and fishing industries are also a dominant presence in the community.

Langlois is also home to the Langlois Market, world famous to Hwy 101 road trippers and travelers, known for their hot dogs and house-made mustard, a 30+ year old family recipe.

Langois has a public library and a small US postal service office.

Langlois is located spanning U.S. Route 101,  by road north of Gold Beach. Floras Creek, a tributary of the New River, passes through the southern part of the community.

Demographics

Notable people 

 Rick Harrison of Pawn Stars

References

External links 
 Port Orford-Langlois School District
 Historic photos of Langlois from Salem Public Library
 Images of historic buildings in Langlois
 Langlois community website

Unincorporated communities in Curry County, Oregon
Census-designated places in Oregon
Unincorporated communities in Oregon